Tortoise Mountain TV Tower is a  high TV Tower in Hanyang District, Wuhan, Hubei, China. It does not stand directly upon the hill, which is occupied by an ancient temple complex (Qing Chuan Ge from the Three Kingdoms, Song, and Ming Dynasties). Guishan TV Tower is China's first self-developed TV tower, opened in 1986.

The tower is located on Guishan ("Tortoise Mountain" or "Turtle Mountain") on the left (northwestern) bank of the Yangtze river, in the part of Wuhan that was historically known as Hanyang. It is located upon the northwestern shoulder of the mountain, reducing the impact upon the ancient temple set upon the peak, that peak being one of the two famous hills of Wuhan, the other being Sheshan (the Snake Mountain) on the opposite, right bank of the Yangtze, in Wuchang; the ancient Yellow Crane Tower is located there. Both hills have many historic ruins, and rows of sculptures of ancient warriors line the hill.

External links

Chinese language site concerning tourist development at the tower
 

1986 establishments in China
Buildings and structures in Wuhan
Communication towers in China
Observation towers
Towers completed in 1986